Movie Maniacs is a 1936 short subject directed by Del Lord starring American slapstick comedy team The Three Stooges (Moe Howard, Larry Fine and Curly Howard). It is the 13th entry in the series released by Columbia Pictures starring the comedians, who released 190 shorts for the studio between 1934 and 1959.

Plot
The Stooges are stowaways on a boxcar carrying a furniture consignment to Hollywood. Fully expecting for no good reason to get a job and become famous movie stars, and dressed for the occasion, the Stooges sneak into a movie studio by trespassing into the studio which they don't allow gate-crashing trespassers without any studio gate passes, where they are mistaken for three new executives who are due to take over the facility. Given the authority, they promptly abuse it and take over the production of a movie set in hopes of shooting a blockbuster movie. Curly gets off on the wrong foot when, unable to light his match for a smoke, spots an actress receiving a pedicure (silent star Mildred Harris). He then strikes the match on the sole of her bare foot, startling her. Angered, she is about to storm off the set until the trio convince her to stay. which caused the angry director, Cecil Z. Swinehardt, the Leading Lady and the Leading man to quit. The trio then act out the love scene as they want it filmed, leading its stars to abandon the set.

Another telegram arrives with the news that three actual executives were delayed by a storm. Angered at the deception, the studio boss and the film's crew go after the Stooges who are actually imposters and studio gate-crashing trespassers who don't have studio gate passes, who flee the scene. After the trio is able to hide from their pursuers, they soon find themselves in a lion's den. The three quickly get into a nearby car, but one of the lions catches up and attacks them, leaving the car to go out of control down a nearby street.

Cast

Credited

Production notes
Movie Maniacs was released on February 20, 1936, only two weeks after the previous release, Ants in the Pantry. It was filmed, though, in October 1935, two months before Ants in the Pantry.

The sign at the studio gate reads "Carnation Pictures: From Contented Actors" The gag refers to Carnation milk, which was long advertised as "from contented cows."

The railroad boxcar at the beginning of the short reads "C. M. & St. P. R.R." which alludes to the Milwaukee Road. The railroad was bankrupt when this short was released (its first bankruptcy was 1925.)

The scene with the Stooges demonstrating kissing techniques was deleted when originally released to television in 1958 by Columbia Studio's television distribution subsidiary Screen Gems, as it was deemed too risqué for children's programming. Home video versions present the completed film with the scene intact.

The original ending involved the Stooges setting fire to the movie set and fleeing the site.

The lions seen at the end of the short were named "Tanner" and "Jackie", both trained by Mel Koontz. The two lions were previously used as Metro-Goldwyn Mayer's mascot. The two would appear in other Stooges shorts (Tanner being the most frequent of the two).

Quotes
Curly: "If at first you don't succeed, keep on sucking 'til you DO succeed!"

References

External links 
 
 
Movie Maniacs at threestooges.net

1936 films
1936 comedy films
American black-and-white films
Films directed by Del Lord
Fiction about rail transport
The Three Stooges films
Columbia Pictures short films
Television series by Screen Gems
American slapstick comedy films
1930s English-language films
1930s American films